Elden Henson (born Elden Ryan Ratliff, August 30, 1977) is an American actor. He is best known for playing Fulton Reed in The Mighty Ducks trilogy (1992–1996), Foggy Nelson in the Marvel Cinematic Universe (MCU) streaming television series Daredevil (2015–2018), The Defenders (2017), Jessica Jones and Luke Cage (both 2018), and Pollux in The Hunger Games: Mockingjay - Part 1 (2014) and Part 2 (2015).

Early life
Elden Ryan Ratliff was born August 30, 1977 in Rockville, Maryland, to Sayde Henson, an educator and former photographer, and George Ratliff, a former New York theater actor. He has two brothers, actors Garette Ratliff Henson (who appeared in The Mighty Ducks with Elden) and Erick Ratliff (who, like Elden, appeared in Elvis & Me). From his father's second marriage, he has a younger half-brother, Ellington Ratliff, who is a member of the band R5.

Henson grew up in Burbank, California. A child actor, he started acting in commercials at age six and booked a series of film and television roles by age ten. Henson attended John Burroughs High School in Burbank, after which he briefly attended Emerson College.

Career
Henson's first professional work was as a print model when he was a toddler. During this time, he was signed to the children's division of Fords Models. By age six, he was acting in commercials. He received his SAG card in 1982. Over the following decade, he acted in films including 1988's Elvis & Me and 1989's Turner & Hooch, and had a series of guest roles on television.

From 1992 to 1996, Henson played Fulton Reed in all three films in The Mighty Ducks trilogy: The Mighty Ducks (1992), D2: The Mighty Ducks (1994) and D3: The Mighty Ducks (1996). He told TV Guide that he owes "a lot of [his] career" to those films. "What's funny is I still, more than anything, get recognized for The Mighty Ducks. I love it. When I was younger, I would get embarrassed. I played sports growing up and I'd be playing baseball and the other team would be quacking at me and stuff. I love those movies. I feel like these things come once in a lifetime and to experience this stuff as a kid and as an adult, I just feel really lucky."

In his early twenties, he had supporting roles in films like The Mighty, She's All That, Idle Hands, O, Dumb and Dumberer: When Harry Met Lloyd, and The Butterfly Effect. He had starring roles in the 1999 TV movie Gift of Love: The Daniel Huffman Story and the 2003 film ‘’The Battle of Shaker Heights’’. During this time, Henson also ran a film production company, Roulette Entertainment, with fellow actor Josh Hartnett. In the late 2000s, he appeared in movies including Lords of Dogtown and Deja Vu, and also made guest appearances on a variety of television shows, including a four-episode arc on the CBS series Smith.

Henson portrayed Apple Computer engineer Andy Hertzfeld in the 2013 biopic Jobs. In September 2013, it was announced that he had been cast as Pollux in The Hunger Games: Mockingjay Parts 1 and 2. Principal photography began that same month in Atlanta, and concluded on June 20, 2014, in Berlin, Germany; the two parts were filmed back-to-back.

Beginning in 2015, Henson portrayed Foggy Nelson in all three seasons of the Netflix television series Daredevil. Marvel announced Henson's casting in June 2014. During the audition for the role of Foggy Nelson, which was held via video conference call, Henson held his phone the wrong way and appeared upside down to others in the meeting. This mishap convinced the show's executives he was the right man for the part. Henson spoke of his excitement for Foggy's role in the series, saying "I was really excited as I was getting the scripts and reading that Foggy wasn't just a useless sidekick. He's not just comic relief. I mean, he is some of those things. He does have comic relief, but it was exciting to know that these other characters would have their own path and their own things that they're dealing with." In addition to Daredevil, Henson has also portrayed Foggy in the crossover miniseries The Defenders and a cameo appearance in the second seasons of Jessica Jones and Luke Cage.

Personal life 
Henson lives in Los Angeles. He has one son, Dodger, with former wife Kira Sternbach.

Filmography

Films

Television

References

External links 
 

1977 births
20th-century American male actors
21st-century American male actors
American male child actors
American male film actors
American male television actors
Emerson College alumni
Living people
Male actors from Maryland
People from Rockville, Maryland